Woodruff is a town in Rich County, Utah, United States. The population was 180 at the 2010 census.

History
The first settlement at Woodruff was made in 1870. A post office called Woodruff has been in operation since 1872. The town was named in honor of Wilford Woodruff, fourth President of The Church of Jesus Christ of Latter-day Saints.

Geography
According to the United States Census Bureau, the town has a total area of 0.5 square mile (1.4 km2), all land.

Climate
This climatic region is typified by large seasonal temperature differences, with warm to summers and cold (sometimes severely cold) winters.  According to the Köppen Climate Classification system, Woodruff has a humid continental climate, abbreviated "Dfb" on climate maps. Woodruff's climate has high diurnal temperature variation, resulting in cold nights even during summer.

Demographics

As of the census of 2000, there were 194 people, 60 households, and 49 families residing in the town. The population density was 361.4 people per square mile (138.7/km2). There were 75 housing units at an average density of 139.7 per square mile (53.6/km2). The racial makeup of the town was 100.00% White.

There were 60 households, out of which 51.7% had children under the age of 18 living with them, 70.0% were married couples living together, 8.3% had a female householder with no husband present, and 16.7% were non-families. 13.3% of all households were made up of individuals, and 1.7% had someone living alone who was 65 years of age or older. The average household size was 3.23, and the average family size was 3.62.

In the town, the population was spread out, with 42.8% under the age of 18, 5.2% from 18 to 24, 24.2% from 25 to 44, 15.5% from 45 to 64, and 12.4% who were 65 years of age or older. The median age was 26 years. For every 100 females, there were 104.2 males. For every 100 females aged 18 and over, there were 109.4 males.

The median income for a household in the town was $43,000, and the median income for a family was $42,750. Males had a median income of $38,333 versus $16,875 for females. The per capita income for the town was $13,976. About 10.5% of families and 18.7% of the population were below the poverty line, including 25.0% of those under the age of eighteen and 11.4% of those 65 or over.

Notable person
 Merlo J. Pusey, journalist and Pulitzer Prize-winning biographer

See also

 List of cities and towns in Utah

References

External links

Towns in Rich County, Utah
Towns in Utah
Populated places established in 1865